James Russell Cotton (May 24, 1915 – February 7, 2009) was an American football quarterback who played one season with the Pittsburgh Steelers of the National Football League (NFL). He played college football at the College of Mines and Metallurgy of the University of Texas—now known as the University of Texas at El Paso (UTEP).

References

1915 births
2009 deaths
American football quarterbacks
Pittsburgh Steelers players
UTEP Miners football players
People from Palestine, Texas
Players of American football from Texas